Jason Sidney Arthur Davis (born November 2, 1983) is a former American football fullback. He was signed by the Philadelphia Eagles as an undrafted free agent in 2006. He played college football at Illinois.

Davis was a member of the Chicago Bears, Oakland Raiders, New York Jets, Hartford Colonials and Virginia Destroyers.

Early years
Davis attended Lindbergh High School in St. Louis, Missouri where he was a four-year starter. Davis played offense and defense in high school. He led Lingbergh to its first-ever district title and a berth in the state playoffs and tallied 54 tackles and three interceptions as a senior He was named second-team All-South by the St. Louis Post-Dispatch as both a defensive back and wide receiver. He also played on the basketball team and was a member of the state champion 4 × 100 m relay team in 2000.

College career
Davis attended the University of Illinois and played fullback for the Illini. He became a starter as a junior in 2004 and caught 41 passes for 340 yards and two touchdowns while running for 230 yards and a touchdown.

Professional career
Davis was not selected in the 2006 NFL Draft but signed with the Philadelphia Eagles as an undrafted free agent. He played in his first NFL game in 2008 with the Oakland Raiders. He also started in three games for the Chicago Bears in 2008.

The New York Jets claimed Davis off waivers on September 6, 2009.

Jason was featured on the reality sports documentary television series Hard Knocks produced by NFL Films and HBO.  The series followed the New York Jets through its 2010 training camp and the team's preparation for the upcoming season. The battle for the starting fullback position between Jason, veteran Tony Richardson, and rookie John Conner was heavily featured. On September 3, 2010, the Jets waived Davis as the team began to make roster cutdowns.

On October 18, 2010, Jason Davis joined the Hartford Colonials of the United Football League (UFL).

References

2.   http://www.ganggreennation.com/2010/9/9/1678359/jason-davis-sets-the-record

External links
Just Sports Stats
Illinois bio
ESPN bio

1983 births
Living people
Players of American football from St. Louis
African-American players of American football
American football fullbacks
Illinois Fighting Illini football players
Philadelphia Eagles players
Chicago Bears players
Oakland Raiders players
New York Jets players
Hartford Colonials players
Virginia Destroyers players
21st-century African-American sportspeople
20th-century African-American people